A telescopic handler, also called a lull, telehandler, teleporter, reach forklift, or zoom boom, is a machine widely used in agriculture and industry. It is somewhat like a forklift but has a boom (telescopic cylinder), making it more a crane than a forklift, with the increased versatility of a single telescopic boom that can extend forwards and upwards from the vehicle. The boom can be fitted with different attachments, such as a bucket, pallet forks, muck grab, or winch.

Uses

In industry, the most common attachment for a telehandler is pallet forks and the most common application is to move loads to and from places unreachable for a conventional forklift. For example, telehandlers have the ability to remove palletised cargo from within a trailer and to place loads on rooftops and other high places. The latter application would otherwise require a crane, which is not always practical or time-efficient.

In agriculture the most common attachment for a telehandler is a bucket or bucket grab, again the most common application is to move loads to and from places unreachable for a 'conventional machine' which in this case is a wheeled loader or backhoe loader. For example, telehandlers have the ability to reach directly into a high-sided trailer or hopper. The latter application would otherwise require a loading ramp, conveyor, or something similar.

The telehandler can also work with a crane jib along with lifting loads, the attachments that include on the market are dirt buckets, grain buckets, rotators, power booms. The agricultural range can also be fitted with three-point linkage and power take-off. 

The advantage of the telehandler is also its biggest limitation: as the boom extends or raises while bearing a load, it acts as a lever and causes the vehicle to become increasingly unstable, despite counterweights in the rear. This means that the lifting capacity quickly decreases as the working radius (distance between the front of the wheels and the centre of the load) increases. When used as a loader the single boom (rather than twin arms) is very highly loaded and even with careful design is a weakness. The operator is equipped with a load chart which helps him determine whether a given task is possible, taking into account weight, boom angle and height. Failing this, most telehandlers now utilize a computer which uses sensors to monitor the vehicle and will warn the operator and/or cut off further control input if the limits of the vehicle are exceeded, the latter being a legal requirement in Europe controlled by EN15000. Machines can also be equipped with front stabilizers which extend the lifting capability of the equipment while stationary, as well machines which are fully stabilised with a rotary joint between upper and lower frames, which can be called mobile cranes although they can typically still use a bucket, and are also often referred to as 'Roto' machines. They are a hybrid between a telehandler and small crane.

Operator licensing 

In some jurisdictions, a license is required in order to operate a telehandler under law or regulations of a national or other jurisdictional authority. 

For example, in Australia, a Gold Card can be obtained for telehandlers with a capacity of three tonnes or less for standard attachments where the machine is operated from below. The Gold Card is issued by the Telescopic Handler Association of Australia (TSHA). The Gold Card is not a legally required qualification however verbal instruction is not considered an appropriate training method as it lacks evidence of competency training. Competency training with evidence of learning and written assessment is legally required in Australia.

A WorkSafe CN licence is a legally required licence for machines with a capacity of over three tonnes with standard attachments where the machine is operated from below.
Telehandlers fitted with elevated work platform attachments and are operated from the basket are classified as elevated work platforms and require elevated work platform licences, such as the EWPA Yellow Card or Worksafe WP Licence.
A WorkSafe C2 licence or higher may apply when using slewing-type telehandlers.

Manufacturers

 MST (TURKEY).
 AUSA (Spain)
 Bobcat (USA)
 Case IH (Italy)
 Caterpillar (USA) – See JLG
 Claas (Germany)
 Deutz (Germany)
 Dieci (Italy)
 Faresin Industries (Italy)
 Gehl (USA)
 Gradall (USA)
 Haulotte (France)
 JCB (England)
 JLG (USA)
 Kramer (Germany)
 Lajvar Industrial Group (Iran)
 Liebherr Group (Germany)
 Pettibone
 Skyjack (Canada) 
 Manitou (France) 
 Merlo (Italy).
 New Holland (Italy)
 SANY Group (China)
 Terex under the Genie brand
 Weidemann (Germany)
 UMG CONSTRUCTION EQUIPMENT (Russian Federation)
 AMKODOR (Republic of Belarus)
 Volvo Construction Equipment (Sweden)

No longer in production

 Ingersoll Rand (USA), purchased by Skyjack and no longer in production under the Ingersoll Rand name.
 Liner Concrete Machinery Company's Liner Giraffe, the predecessor of the modern telescopic handler (1974)
 Matbro (England)

See also
 Reach stacker

References

External links

Agricultural machinery
Engineering vehicles
Mobile cranes